Hoo Stack is a small island off Nesting in Shetland. It is one and a half miles from the North Isle of Gletness.

See also

 List of lighthouses in Scotland
 List of Northern Lighthouse Board lighthouses

References

External links
 Northern Lighthouse Board 
 Picture of Hoo Stack Lighthouse

Uninhabited islands of Shetland